Carmel Waterbury Bodel (1912 - 2013) was an American figure skater.  She competed in ice dance with Edward Bodel, and the pair was married in 1949.  The Bodels won the gold medal at the U.S. Figure Skating Championships three times and captured the bronze medal at the 1954 World Figure Skating Championships.

Competitive highlights
(with Edward)

Notes

1912 births
2013 deaths
American female ice dancers
World Figure Skating Championships medalists
21st-century American women